Jordan Kévin Amavi (born 9 March 1994) is a French professional footballer who plays as a left back for La Liga club Getafe, on loan from Marseille. He has previously played professionally for Aston Villa and Nice. He has played regularly for France as a youth player and was called into the senior squad in late 2017 but is yet to make his debut.

Club career

Nice
Born in Toulon, Amavi made his Ligue 1 debut with Nice in the opening game of the 2013–14 season on 10 August 2013 against Lyon.

Aston Villa
On 18 July 2015 he signed for Premier League side Aston Villa on a five-year contract for an undisclosed fee, reported to be in the region of £9 million. He made his debut on 8 August, playing the full 90 minutes of a 1–0 win over Bournemouth at Dean Court. On 15 November, Amavi suffered an ACL tear in his right knee while on duty with the France U21 team, ending his first season at Aston Villa.

Without Amavi, Villa were relegated to the EFL Championship, the second tier of English football, which lead to speculation on the future of Amavi as well as other Villa players. However, Amavi decided to continue playing for Villa for the 2016–17 season, as he had high hopes on Villa being promoted immediately back up to the Premier League. On 27 December 2016, Aston Villa turned down an £25 million bid from an undisclosed club from China for Amavi; reports in France also claimed that Marseille had also bid for the player. That season, he made 34 appearances in the Championship for Villa, but they finished in a bottom-half thirteenth-place league finish.

Marseille
On 10 August 2017, it was agreed that Amavi would join Ligue 1 side Olympique de Marseille on loan for the entirety of the 2017–18 season, with Marseille also considering interest in signing the player in a permanent transfer in the following season.

Marseille decided to make Amavi's move permanent in October 2017, meeting an agreed clause in the loan contract.

On 3 May 2018, he played in the Europa League semi-finals away to FC Red Bull Salzburg as Marseilles played out a 1–2 away loss but a 3–2 aggregate win to secure a place in the 2018 UEFA Europa League Final to be played at the Parc Olympique Lyonnais in Décines-Charpieu, Lyon, France on 16 May 2018. A double from Antoine Griezmann helped Atlético Madrid defeat Amavi's Marseille side 3–0 and win the trophy.

Return to Nice (loan)
On 5 January 2022, Amavi returned to former club Nice on loan until the end of the 2021–22 season with an option to buy.

Loan to Getafe
On 1 September 2022, Amavi was loaned to La Liga side Getafe for the season.

International career
Amavi is of Togolese descent and was part of the France under-20 team which finished as runners-up to Brazil at the 2014 Toulon Tournament.

He was called up to the senior France squad for a World Cup qualifier against Belarus in October 2017.

Career statistics

Honours
Marseille
UEFA Europa League runner-up: 2017–18

Nice
Coupe de France runner-up: 2021–22

References

External links
 
 
 OM profile
 
 

1994 births
Living people
Sportspeople from Toulon
French sportspeople of Togolese descent
French footballers
OGC Nice players
Aston Villa F.C. players
Olympique de Marseille players
Getafe CF footballers
Association football defenders
Premier League players
English Football League players
Ligue 1 players
Championnat National 2 players
Championnat National 3 players
La Liga players
France youth international footballers
France under-21 international footballers
French expatriate footballers
Expatriate footballers in England
French expatriate sportspeople in England
Black French sportspeople
Footballers from Provence-Alpes-Côte d'Azur
Expatriate footballers in Spain
French expatriate sportspeople in Spain